The Dark Peak is the higher and wilder part of the Peak District in England, mostly forming the northern section but also extending south into its eastern and western margins. It is mainly in Derbyshire but parts are in Staffordshire, Cheshire, Greater Manchester, West Yorkshire and South Yorkshire.

It gets its name because (in contrast to the White Peak), the underlying limestone is covered by a cap of Millstone Grit sandstones with softer shale underneath, meaning that in winter the soil is almost always saturated with water. The land is thus largely uninhabited moorland plateaux where almost any depression is filled with sphagnum bogs and black peat. The High Peak is an alternative name for the Dark Peak, but High Peak is also the name of an administrative district of Derbyshire which includes part of the White Peak.

The areas of Millstone Grit form an 'inverted horseshoe' around the lower uncapped limestone areas of the White Peak, enclosing it to the west, north and east. Hence the Dark Peak is said to cover the higher, northern moors between the Hope Valley to the south and the Tame Valley, Standedge and Holme Valley to the north, separating it from the South Pennines, the Western Moors stretching south to near the Churnet Valley, and the Eastern Moors southwards towards Matlock.

The SSSI extends over the borders into Greater Manchester and West Yorkshire. A large part of the SSSI is included in the South Pennine Moors Special Area of Conservation.

Principal upland areas within the Dark Peak include Kinder Scout, Bleaklow (both of which rise to over ), Black Hill, the Roaches, Shining Tor, Mam Tor, Win Hill and Stanage Edge.

Aircraft crashes 
Over the years, military aircraft have crashed on the Dark Peak, generally because of a combination of numerous nearby air bases, inexperienced pilots, primitive or faulty equipment and poor visibility. Because of the bleakness and emptiness of the high moorlands and the consequent difficulties of recovery, substantial wreckage remains at some sites in remote parts of the moorland, though militarily sensitive materials were removed and salvage teams sometimes gathered debris into piles, or burned or buried it.

References

External links
 Photos and descriptions of Dark Peak landscapes.
 Dark Peak Aircraft Wrecks
 Citizendium's Dark Peak article includes a history of the area

Peak District
Sites of Special Scientific Interest in Derbyshire
Sites of Special Scientific Interest in South Yorkshire
Sites of Special Scientific Interest in West Yorkshire
Sites of Special Scientific Interest in Greater Manchester
Natural regions of England
Moorlands of England